This is a list of companies having stocks that are included in the S&P SmallCap 600. The S&P 600 is an index of small-cap company stocks created by Standard & Poor's. The index is weighted by float-adjusted market capitalization (companies with higher value are relatively weighted more in the index), where public shares are only taken into consideration, excluding promoters' holding, government holding, strategic holding, and other locked-in shares.



S&P 600 Component Stocks
Stocks here are cross referenced with the following index funds to compose the list:
Vanguard S&P Small-Cap 600 ETF
SPDR Portfolio S&P 600 Small Cap ETF
iShares Core S&P Small-Cap ETF
These index funds may be rebalanced at different intervals resulting in a small difference in holdings.

The following table is sorted by ticker symbol by default.

Recent and announced changes to the list of S&P 600 components
Periodically, S&P Dow Jones Indices reflects the changes of the index in response to company takeover, or updates the index based on company market capitalization. Changes to index composition are made on an as needed basis. There is no scheduled reconstitution. Rather, changes in response to corporate actions and market developments can be made at any time.

See also
Russell 1000 Index
S&P 400
List of S&P 400 companies
S&P 500
List of S&P 500 companies
S&P 1500

References 

American stock market indices
Lists of companies
S&P Dow Jones Indices